The 2019 Women's African Nations Championship was the 19th edition of the Women's African Volleyball Championship organised by Africa's governing volleyball body, the Confédération Africaine de Volleyball. Held in Cairo, Egypt, the tournament took place from 9 to 14 July 2019.

Cameroon won the championship defeating Kenya and Senegal won the bronze medal over Egypt.

Competing nations
The following national teams have confirmed participation:

Venue

Format
The tournament is played in two stages. In the first stage, the participants are divided in two groups. A single round-robin format is played within each group to determine the teams' group position (as per procedure below).
 
The two best teams of each group progress to the second stage, the second stage of the tournament consists of a single-elimination, with winners advancing to the next round until the final round.

Pool standing procedure
 Number of matches won
 Match points
 Sets ratio
 Points ratio
 Result of the last match between the tied teams

Match won 3–0 or 3–1: 3 match points for the winner, 0 match points for the loser
Match won 3–2: 2 match points for the winner, 1 match point for the loser

Pools composition
The drawing of lots was held in Cairo, Egypt on 8 July.

Preliminary round
 All times are Central Africa Time (UTC+02:00).

Pool A

|}

|}

Pool B

|}

|}

Final round
 All times are Central Africa Time (UTC+02:00).

5th–7th classification

5th–7th play-off

|}

5th place match

|}

Championship round

Semifinals

|}

3rd place match

|}

Final

|}

Final standing

See also
2019 Men's African Volleyball Championship

References

External links
Official website

2019 Women
African Women's Volleyball Championship
Women's African Volleyball Championship
2019 in Egyptian sport
International sports competitions hosted by Egypt
Volleyball in Egypt
Sports competitions in Cairo
African Volleyball Championship